Calyptromyia stupenda is a species of fly in the family Tachinidae.

Distribution
Madagascar.

References

Phasiinae
Diptera of Africa
Insects described in 1981